Aqua Kids may refer to:
Aqua Kids (animation), a Korean animation cartoon series aired in Japan
Aqua Kids (TV series), a syndicated children's television program